Alberto Abdala (8 April 1920 – 13 January 1986) was an Uruguayan attorney, politician, painter and Vice-President from 1967 to 1972.

Background
Alberto Abdala was born in Maldonado, Uruguay in 1920. He was of Lebanese descent.

He was a member of the Colorado Party. He served as Interior Minister and later as member of the Consejo Nacional de Gobierno.

In 1966, the "Batllismo" faction of the Colorado Party didn't have a natural leader to run for the presidential elections of November of that year, after the death in 1964 of the faction's leader, former President Luis Batlle. Some members of the faction insisted that Abdala should be the presidential candidate representing this sector, including Luis Batlle´ son, Jorge Batlle. Ultimately, Abdala refused to run and future President Jorge Batlle was finally selected.

Vice President of Uruguay
After the death of President Óscar Gestido, and the succession to the presidency of Vice President Jorge Pacheco, Alberto Abdala, being the first senator on "Unidad y Reforma" Senate list (the most voted Senate list within the Colorado Party), became Vice President. He diverged from many political decisions taken by the Pacheco administration, without, however, resigning. He considered a run for the Presidency in the 1971 elections, but in the end desisted, not wanting to split Unidad y Reforma, and supported a new bid for the presidency by Jorge Batlle.

Historical note
Abdala was the seventh person to hold the office of Vice President of Uruguay. The office dates from 1934, when Alfredo Navarro became Uruguay's first Vice President.

Subsequent events and legacy
Abdala was succeeded 1972 as Vice President of Uruguay by Jorge Sapelli, whose differences with the Administration in which he served would, unlike Abdala, lead him to repudiate the office of Vice President, and which thus went into abeyance for many years.

He is remembered as a quite popular political figure, even though the year after he stepped down the office which he held disappeared for many years.

Alberto Abdala died in Montevideo in 1986.

References

See also
 Politics of Uruguay
 Lebanese Uruguayan

1920 births
1986 deaths
People from Maldonado, Uruguay
Interior ministers of Uruguay
Uruguayan people of Lebanese descent
Uruguayan Maronites
National Council of Government (Uruguay)
Vice presidents of Uruguay
Presidents of the Senate of Uruguay
University of the Republic (Uruguay) alumni
Academic staff of the University of the Republic (Uruguay)
Colorado Party (Uruguay) politicians
20th-century Uruguayan lawyers